Calvert Street may refer to:

Calvert Street (Baltimore), the northbound portion of Maryland Route 2 in northern Baltimore, Maryland
Calvert Street (Washington, D.C.), a street in Washington, D.C.